Arman Darvish (born August 20, 1987) is an Iranian actor. He is known for his acting in Wednesday (2016), Human Comedy (2017) and Queen of Beggars (2021).

Career
Arman Darvish made his cinematic debut in 2016 with the movie Wednesday and has since appeared in various cinematic projects and in 2018 he won the Best Actor award for Human Comedy in 9th Annual Norway Tamil Film Festival.

Prior to his acting career, he worked with Iranian writer and director Mohammad Hadi Karimi for many years, also he writing screenplays, making short films, and writing articles and film reviews for publications.

Filmography

Film

Web

References

بیوگرافی کامل آرمان درویش | بررسی آثار 
آرمان درویش ستاره سینما خواهد شد؟

External links

 
 

Living people
1987 births
People from Hamadan
Iranian male film actors
Iranian male television actors